The 1973 Individual Long Track World Championship was the third edition of the FIM speedway Individual Long Track World Championship. The event was held on 20 September 1973 in Oslo, Norway.

The defending champion Ivan Mauger failed to qualify for the semi-final round after being eliminated in a qualifying round. The world title was won by Ole Olsen of Denmark.

Final Classification 

Key
 E = Eliminated (no further ride)

References 

1973
Sport in Norway
Speedway competitions in Norway
Motor
Motor